Big Brother Recordings Ltd. is a record label set up in 2000 to release material by rock band Oasis in the UK and Ireland. On 19 June 2008 a deal was signed with Sony BMG which entitled them to an arranged portion of the profits from the next three Oasis studio albums to be released through Big Brother. The name of the company is a reference to the band's guitarist, singer and songwriter Noel Gallagher, who is the older brother of lead singer Liam Gallagher. The catalogue number of each release begins with "RKID", which stands for "our kid"; Northern England slang to refer to a brother.

The imprint was started after Alan McGee announced on 25 November 1999 that he was leaving Creation Records, Oasis' original record company. The first release on Big Brother was the single "Go Let It Out" (catalogue number 'RKID 001') on 7 February 2000, the lead single from the band's fourth studio album, Standing on the Shoulder of Giants. On 14 August 2000, all of Oasis's singles from Definitely Maybe, (What's the Story) Morning Glory? and Be Here Now were re-issued on the Big Brother label and given new RKID catalogue numbers. In 2005, British band Happy Mondays released their first new material in over 13 years on the Big Brother label, with the single "Playground Superstar".

In addition to Big Brother Recordings, Noel Gallagher has Sour Mash Records, a label founded in 2001, who has signed Proud Mary (band from Royton) and Shack (band formed in Liverpool).

Big Brother were reported to be buying back the rights to Oasis' back catalogue from Sony BMG, who took complete control of Creation Records in 2000. The new deal signed with Sony means this process is on hold for the foreseeable future.

In September 2007, Oasis signed a record deal with Universal Music Group, and the Lord Don't Slow Me Down DVD was released by Big Brother Recordings Ltd. in United Kingdom, and Big Brother Recordings Ltd./Universal Music internationally. Also released was their first ever digital only single on 21 October 2007, "Lord Don't Slow Me Down".

On 30 July 2008, Reprise Records announced that it has signed a North American distribution deal with Big Brother Recordings. The first new release under the deal was "Dig Out Your Soul," in October 2008.

The logo of the label, pictured above, appeared on the back of the white piano that Jay Darlington played at the Oasis concerts. It can be seen on the live performance second disc of Lord Don't Slow Me Down.

Appointed the7stars as their media planning and buying agency in 2007.

List of releases 

 * Reissues of Oasis' old Creation Records material.
 ** Promo only
 *** Record Store Day only
 **** HMV exclusive only

References

External links 
Oasis website

Oasis (band)
British record labels
Record labels established in 2000
Indie rock record labels
Sony Music